Vatne may refer to:

People
Bjarne Karsten Vatne (1926—2009), a Norwegian politician for the Labour Party
Oddbjørn Vatne (born 1948), a Norwegian politician for the Centre Party
Stian Vatne (born 1974), a Norwegian handball player

Places
Vatne Church, a church in Ålesund municipality, Møre og Romsdal county, Norway
Vatne, Farsund, a village in Farsund municipality, Agder county, Norway
Vatne, Hægebostad, a village in Hægebostad municipality, Agder county, Norway
Vatne, Lindesnes, a village in Lindesnes municipality, Agder county, Norway
Vatne, Møre og Romsdal, a village in Haram municipality, Møre og Romsdal county, Norway
Vatne Municipality, a former municipality in Møre og Romsdal county, Norway
Vatne, Rogaland, a village in Sandnes municipality, Rogaland county, Norway
Vatne, Ørsta, a village in Ørsta municipality, Møre og Romsdal county, Norway